Atlas Hospitality is a private corporate group that owns and manages hotels in Morocco. Headquartered in Casablanca the company focuses on two main sectors leisure and tourism.

History 

The company was founded in 1996 and supervised by Mohamed Berrada who was then the President and general director of Royal Air Maroc (RAM). In 2005, Kamal Bensouda was named general director of Atlas hospitality group.

In 2010, RAM ceased its participation in Atlas hospitality as a part of re-centring their priorities. RAM yielded its 66% stake to H-Partners fund which is a private investment fund that specialises in tourism. The other 34% stake of Atlas hospitality are owned by SNI (Al Mada) which is a Moroccan conglomerate presided by Mounir Majidi.

Expansion 
The group expanded its ownership of hotels from two units to 19 and became the second largest hotel operator in Morocco. In 2005, Atlas hospitality was made up of eight units. Between 2006-2007, it moved to owning 12 units, this included the launching of 1500 beds in Agadir, Esser and Taliouine and the opening of a hotel dubbed “Atlas Rif Front Beach” in Tangier for the international conference of tourism.

In 2010, the hotel chain Atlas hospitality partnered with Akwa Group and Somed group. The partnership with Akwa targeted the Agadir Marina and expanded its capacity to host tourists. The partnership with Somed was industrial and strategic. It focused on the management and logistics of three hotels situated in Agadir, Casablanca and Tangier.

In 2015, Atlas hospitality experienced 2.8% growth in the tourism sector. This was achieved by partnering with Meeting Point Hotel Management which is part of the German FTI Group. The same group sent 40,000 travellers to Morocco in the same year. Atlas hospitality was allocated $55 million to buy existing hotels and build new ones in various regions including Essaouira and Al Hoceima.

In 2016, Atlas hospitality signed a joint venture with the FTI Group (4th largest tour operator in Germany). This partnership aims at investing 1.1 billion dirhams and it consists of revamping the following clubs: Atlas Targa Club, the Idrissides Urban Club and the Dunes d’Or Beach Club. The first phase of the investment will cost MAD600 and the second one will cost MAD500. FTI plans on increasing the number of flights to Morocco (eleven per week) and the number of travellers to 150,000 by 2018. As of December 2016, three Atlas Hotels were rebranded into Labranda Targa Club, Labranda Dunes D’Or Beach Club and Labranda the Idrissides. The joint venture aims at building three hotels in the Chbika region which should be ready to host people by 2020. The new hotels will be branded Labranda Maroc.

Services 
The company offers 5-star and 4-star hotels, thematically classified into three categories: Atlas Aqua parc, Atlas to live and Seaside Atlas Resorts. Each classification caters to a different group of people with various interests and vacation plans.

Resorts and hotels 
Atlas hospitality has several hotels and resorts around Morocco: 
 Atlas Sky Airport Hotel
 Relax Airport Hotel
 Atlas Almohades Casablanca City Centre 
 Labranda Dunes D’Or Beach Club
 Labranda Targa Club 
 Labranda the Idrissides 
 Le Savoy Grand Hotel
 Atlas Amadil Aqua Parc Agadir 
 Bianca Beach Family Resort 
 Atlas Asni Marrakech
 Hotel Medina Marrakech 
 Atlas Rif Front Beach Tanger
 Atlas Orient Oujda
 Atlas Volubilis Fès 
 Atlas Fès & Spa 
 Royal Atlas Agadir Hotel
 Hotel Palais Medina Fes 
 Hotel Jardins d'Agdal Marrakech

References 

Hospitality companies established in 1996
Hospitality companies of Morocco